Jeri Lynn Ryan (née Zimmermann; born February 22, 1968) is an American actress who played the former Borg drone Seven of Nine in Star Trek: Voyager, for which she was nominated four times for a Saturn Award and won in 2001. She has reprised her role as Seven of Nine in Star Trek: Picard.

Ryan also played Veronica "Ronnie" Cooke on Boston Public (2001–2004). She was a regular on the science fiction series Dark Skies (1997) and the legal drama series Shark (2006–2008). In 2009 she guest starred on the series Leverage as Tara Cole. From 2011 to 2013, she starred as Dr. Kate Murphy in the ABC drama series Body of Proof. In 2016, she began appearing as Veronica Allen on the Amazon Prime series Bosch.

Early life
Ryan was born Jeri Lynn Zimmermann on February 22, 1968, in Munich, West Germany, the daughter of Gerhard Florian "Jerry" Zimmermann, a master sergeant in the U.S. Army, and his wife Sharon, a social worker. She has one older brother, Mark. Ryan grew up on Army posts in Kansas, Maryland, Hawaii, Georgia and Texas.

When she was 11, her father retired from the Army and the family settled in Paducah, Kentucky. She graduated from Lone Oak High School in 1986 as a National Merit Scholar, and then attended Northwestern University, where she was a member of the Alpha Phi sorority. She graduated from Northwestern in 1990 with a bachelor's degree in theatre.

In 1989, Ryan was chosen as Miss Illinois. She competed in the Miss America 1990 pageant, where she finished as third runner-up, winning the preliminary swimsuit competition and singing "On My Own" from Les Misérables for her talent.

Career

After college, she pursued acting full-time in Los Angeles. She made her acting debut in Who's the Boss?, and followed that with guest-starring roles in television series such as Melrose Place, Matlock, and The Sentinel as well as TV movies.

She had a regular role as the extraterrestrial investigator Juliet Stuart on the television series Dark Skies. The series was cancelled after one season, but the role had drawn the attention of the science-fiction community.

In 1997, Ryan was chosen for a role on the science fiction series Star Trek: Voyager as Seven of Nine, a Borg drone who had been freed from the Borg's collective consciousness. When she joined the cast in season four, ratings increased 60%.

She appeared in Wes Craven's Dracula 2000. After Voyager ended in 2001, Ryan joined the cast of Boston Public in the role of Veronica "Ronnie" Cooke, a frustrated lawyer who becomes a high school teacher. David E. Kelley, the series' producer, wrote the role specifically for her. The series ended in 2004.

Ryan appeared in the romantic-comedy film Down with Love and as Lydia in the independent film Men Cry Bullets. Ryan's first film lead was in The Last Man as the last woman left on Earth.

In 2005 she had a role in a TV pilot titled Commuters, a suburban version of Desperate Housewives. She had a recurring role as Charlotte Morgan on The O.C. in 2005; and she guest-starred as Courtney Reece on David E. Kelley's Boston Legal in 2006. Ryan then co-starred in the legal drama Shark as Los Angeles County District Attorney Jessica Devlin alongside series lead James Woods, but she did not return for episodes aired after the 2007–2008 Writers Guild of America strike; she was credited in all four episodes. The series did not air between January 27 and April 29, 2008. CBS cancelled the broadcast of the series after its season-two finale, May 20, 2008.

She guest-starred as defense attorney Patrice La Rue on the April 7, 2009, episode of Law & Order: Special Victims Unit, her first role since giving birth to her daughter Gisele. Ryan next had a seven-episode role on the drama Leverage in season 2 as a grifter named Tara Cole, filling in while series regular Gina Bellman (Sophie) was on maternity leave.

She was in Kevin Tancharoen's short film Mortal Kombat: Rebirth as Sonya Blade. Although originally a film, it was marketed as a web series, with previews scheduled to appear online in June 2010. The web series Mortal Kombat: Legacy officially launched in March 2011.

Ryan was a regular in the series Body of Proof, which premiered on March 29, 2011.

Ryan continued to appear in guest roles on genre television series, including the science fiction series Warehouse 13 as Marine Major Amanda Lattimer, ex-wife of the series' male lead character Pete Lattimer, in the episode "Queen for a Day". Ryan made a return guest appearance on the drama Leverage in season 4, episode 13 as the grifter Tara Cole, in the episode titled "The Girls' Night Out Job". She also appeared for a multi-episode arc in season 1 of the science fiction series Helix. She was next seen in the series Star Trek: Picard, reprising her role as Seven of Nine.

Personal life

In 1990, while dealing blackjack at a charity event, the actress met investment banker and future Republican political candidate Jack Ryan. The couple married on June 15, 1991, in Wilmette, Illinois. They later had a son, Alex, on August 15, 1994. Jeri commuted between Los Angeles and Wilmette during their marriage. They divorced on August 27, 1999. A few years after she joined the Voyager cast, Ryan began dating Star Trek: Voyager producer Brannon Braga. Between February and November 2000, they were stalked by Marlon Estacio Pagtakhan, who was convicted for harassment and threats in May 2001.

When Jack Ryan's campaign for an open United States Senate seat in Illinois began in 2003, the Chicago Tribune newspaper and WLS-TV, the local ABC affiliate, sought to have his records released. Both Jeri and Jack agreed to make their divorce records, but not their custody records, public, saying the latter's release could be harmful to their son.

On June 18, 2004, Los Angeles Superior Court Judge Robert Schnider agreed to release the custody files. The decision went against both parents' direct request and reversed the decision to seal the papers in the best interest of the child. It was revealed that six years earlier, Jeri had accused Jack Ryan of asking her to perform sexual acts with him in public and in sex clubs in New York, New Orleans, and Paris. Jeri described one as "a bizarre club with cages, whips, and other apparatus hanging from the ceiling." Jack denied these allegations. Although Jeri only made a brief statement, and she refused to comment on the matter during the campaign, the document disclosure led Jack to withdraw his candidacy; his main opponent, Barack Obama, then won the 2004 United States Senate election in Illinois.

According to statements she has made in interviews, Ryan's main hobby is gourmet cooking. While starring in Boston Public, she moonlighted on weekends in the kitchen of the Los Angeles restaurant The House. In 2003, Ryan met French chef Christophe Émé at a chef's charity event. The two eventually began a relationship, and Émé moved in with Ryan and her son Alex in their home in San Fernando Valley. In February 2005, Ryan, a "lifelong Francophile", opened—in partnership with Émé—the restaurant Ortolan. Located on Third Street in Los Angeles, California, the restaurant served French food with a modern interpretation. The two have appeared on Iron Chef America, where Émé and one sous-chef challenged Iron Chef Masaharu Morimoto and his two sous-chefs. The restaurant is seen in season 2, episode 26 of Boston Legal as Denny Crane (William Shatner) and Alan Shore (James Spader) are discussing the arrival of Courtney Reece (Jeri Ryan) at "her favorite restaurant." Despite its success, the restaurant was hit hard by the Great Recession and it closed in December 2010.

Ryan and Émé married in the Loire Valley, France on June 16, 2007. In March 2008, Ryan gave birth to a daughter in Los Angeles, California.

Notable awards and nominations
 1998 Nominated for a Saturn Award for Best Genre TV Actress for her role in Star Trek: Voyager
 1999 Nominated for a Saturn Award for Best Genre TV Actress for her role in Star Trek: Voyager
 1999 Won Golden Satellite Award for Best Performance by an Actress in a Television Series—Drama for her role in Star Trek: Voyager
 2000 Nominated for a Saturn Award for Best Genre TV Supporting Actress for her role in Star Trek: Voyager
 2001 Won Saturn Award for Best Supporting Actress on Television for her role in Star Trek: Voyager

Filmography

Film

Television films

Television series

Video games

References

External links

 
 
 
 
 
 BBC Online interview
 Jeri Ryan Biography , Startrek.com
 Ortolan Restaurant 

1968 births
Living people
20th-century American actresses
21st-century American actresses
Actresses from Kentucky
Actresses from Munich
American film actresses
American people of German descent
American women restaurateurs
American restaurateurs
American television actresses
Lone Oak High School (Kentucky) alumni
Miss America 1990 delegates
Miss America Preliminary Swimsuit winners
Northwestern University School of Communication alumni
People from Paducah, Kentucky